is a Japanese actress and voice actress working with Ken Production.

Filmography

Anime

1969
Sazae-san (Mariko Hasegawa)

1985
Ninja Robots (Francois Queen, Maria)

1986
Anmitsu Hime (Chāshū, Kanoko's Mother)
Pastel Yumi, the Magic Idol (Tsuyoshi)

1987
Kimagure Orange Road (Female Teacher)

1988
City Hunter 2 (Princess Angela)

1989
Idol Densetsu Eriko (Yuki)
Esper Mami (Junpei's Mother)
Time Travel Tondekeman (Ababara, Alien Type Yakan, Mamatedekeman)
YAWARA! a fashionable judo girl (Kristin Adams)

1990
Brave Exkaiser (Yoko Hoshikawa)

1991
Oishinbo (Anna Marina)
The Mischievous Twins (Mrs. Naylor)
The Brave Fighter of Sun Fighbird (Katchan's Mother)
Future GPX Cyber Formula (Junko Kazami)
Matchless Raijin-Oh (Aiko Shimada)
Oniisama E... (Aya Misaki's Mother)

1992
The Bush Baby (Raiza)
Space Oz no Bōken (Uncle Emily, Hagi)
Kobo-chan (Akiko)
Mikan Enikki (Mrs. Yokota)

1993
Yūsha Tokkyū Might Gaine (Aunt)
Ocean Waves (Taku's Mother)
Mukamuka Paradise (Dosu Dosu)

1994
Akazukin Cha Cha (Queen)
Mobile Fighter G Gundam (Mikino Kasshu)

1995
Romeo and the Black Brothers (Cristina)
Nurse Angel Ririka SOS (Principal)
Saint Tail (Ninomiya's Mother)

1996
 Meiken Lassie (Annie Monaghan)
 Kodomo no Omocha (Sumire Ando)

1997
Hare Tokidoki Buta (Uncle Binbinba)
Fortune Quest L (Mother, Linda White)

1998
Trigun (Joshua)
Legend of Basara (Makoto's Mother)
Lost Universe (Alice)
His and Her Circumstances (Arima's aunt, mother)
Senki Iris Rainbow (Karen)
Ojarumaru (Mariko Jumonji)

1999
Kakyūsei (female customer (ep 6))
Weekly Story Land (Narrator)

2000
KAIKAN Phrase (Yuki's Mother)
Inspector Fabre (Ricard)
Invincible King Tri-Zenon (Ryōko Uryū)

2001
Noir (Marguerite)
Figure 17 (Rin Ibaragi)
Shaman King (Tao Ran)

2002
The Twelve Kingdoms (Ritsuko Nakajima)
Getbackers (Ban's Mother)

2003
Astro Boy: Mighty Atom (Yunomu)
Happy Lesson Advanced (???)

2004
Daphne in the Brilliant Blue (Helena Nakayashiki)
Fafner in the Azure (Chisato Kodate)
Atashin'chi (Fortune Teller)
Maria Watches Over Us Season 2: Printemps (Yumi's mother)
Agatha Christie no Meitantei Poirot to Marple (Mrs. Barnard)

2005
Kaiketsu Zorori (Grandma)
Canvas 2 – Niji Iro no Sketch (Yukiko Housen)
Kotenkotenko (Suno-san)

2006
Wan Wan Serebu Soreyuke! Tetsunoshin (Chiyo)
Yomigaeru Sora – RESCUE WINGS - (Ryouko Shaura)
Ouran High School Host Club (Lady)
The Third: The Girl with the Blue Eye (Female president)
Yakeato no, Okashi no Ki (Taichi's Mother)
Death Note (Sachiko Yagami)

2007
Gakuen Utopia Manabi Straight! (Gakuenchou)
Darker than Black (Berta)
Futatsu no Kurumi (Tomiko)

2008
Noramimi (Shigeru's Mother)
Allison & Lillia (Ema)
Kiku-chan to Ōkami (Narration)

2009
Maria Watches Over Us 4th Season (Miki Fukuzawa)
Fullmetal Alchemist: Brotherhood (Mrs. Bradley)

2011
Battle Girls – Time Paradox (Chief Priest)
Twin Angel: Twinkle Paradise (Sakie Kannazuki)
No. 6 (Aunt)
Chihayafuru (Karuta Reader)

2012
Danball Senki W (Madame Bullhorn)

2019
Yo-kai Watch! (Koma Kaa-chan)

OVA
Lunn Flies into the Wind) (1985) (Girlfriend)
Laughing Target (1987) (Satomi's Mother)
Assemble Insert (1989) (Okami)
Eguchi Hisashi no Kotobuki Goro Show (1991) (Kirishima's Wife, Refined Mother)
Kiss wa Me ni shite (1993) (Ibuki's mother)

Movies
Bio Booster Armor Guyver (1986) as Mother
Memories (1995)
Marco: 3000 Leagues in Search of Mother (1999) as Gina Grandmother
Pokémon: Zoroark: Master of Illusions (2010) as Tomo

Video games
Langrisser: Hikari no Matsuei (1993) as Jessica
Langrisser III (1996) as Jessica
Final Fantasy VII Remake (2020) as Jessie's Mother

Dubbing

Live-action
Beethoven (Brie Wilson (Patricia Heaton))
Clear and Present Danger (Moira Wolfson (Ann Magnuson))
College Road Trip (Michelle Porter (Kym Whitley))
The Crow (Darla Mohr (Anna Thomson))
Full House (Clare)
Harry Potter (Petunia Dursley (Fiona Shaw))
Hocus Pocus (Mary Sanderson (Kathy Najimy))
Mighty Morphin Power Rangers (Ms. Appleby)
Painted Faces (Ching (Cheng Pei-pei))
The Purple Rose of Cairo (Emma (Dianne Wiest), Kitty Haynes (Karen Akers))
Snake Eyes (Julia Costello (Carla Gugino))
Ultraman: The Ultimate Hero (Mitchell's neighbors, Wittigher's Assistant)

Animation
Cats Don't Dance (Tilly)
Chicken Run (Babs)
Corpse Bride (Nell Van Dort)
The Croods (Ugga Crood)
The Croods: A New Age (Ugga Crood)
Happy Feet (Ms. Viola)
Happy Feet Two (Ms. Viola)
Inside Out (Mother's Sadness)
Peppa Pig (George Pig)
Shrek 2 (Fairy Godmother)
WALL-E (Mary)

CD Drama
 Fushigi Yugi: Genbu Kaiten (Polate, Narration)

References

External links
Ai Satou at Ken Production
 

1955 births
Japanese video game actresses
Japanese voice actresses
Living people
20th-century Japanese actresses
21st-century Japanese actresses
Ken Production voice actors